Wilbur Edwin "Ed" Goebel (September 1, 1898 – August 12, 1959) was a Major League Baseball player. He was used as mostly as a pinch hitter, and also as a right fielder.

External links

1898 births
1959 deaths
Major League Baseball right fielders
Washington Senators (1901–1960) players
Sportspeople from Brooklyn
Baseball players from New York City